Angayuqaq Oscar Kawagley (November 8, 1934 – April 27, 2011), best known as Oscar Kawagley, was a Yup'ik anthropologist, teacher and actor from Alaska. He was an associate professor of education at the University of Alaska, Fairbanks until his death in 2011. The Anchorage Daily News described him as "one of (Alaska's) most influential teachers and thinkers".

Career 

Kawagley's 1995 book A Yupiaq Worldview: a Pathway to Ecology and Spirit was an attempt to reconcile indigenous and Western worldviews from an indigenous perspective, and was an important contribution to the field of ethnoecology. In the book he developed the concept of "indigenous methodology", explaining how western science can benefit from native ways of understanding and vice versa. 

Oscar's acting career included a major role in the independent 1991 film Salmonberries, starring k.d. lang. He appeared in the television show Northern Exposure, and contributed his voice to the elderly Denahi in the 2003 Disney film Brother Bear.

Death 
He died of cancer in Fairbanks, Alaska, in 2011 at the age of 76. His ashes were scattered after his cremation.

Publications
 Kawagley, A. O. (2006). A Yupiaq Worldview: A Pathway to Ecology and Spirit. United States: Waveland Press.

Filmography

References 

1934 births
2011 deaths
Alaska Native inventors and scientists
American anthropologists
Deaths from cancer in Alaska
Male actors from Alaska
People from Bethel, Alaska
University of British Columbia Faculty of Education alumni